Antonio D. Laxa (June 12, 1934 – January 23, 2021), better known by his stage name Tony Ferrer, was a Filipino actor, film director and producer. He was tagged as the James Bond of the Philippines for his films in which he played a spy named Tony Falcon in the Agent X-44 movie series.

He won Best Actor at the Quezon City Film Festival for Sapagkat Sila'y Aming Mga Anak (1970) with Boots Anson-Roa and Vilma Santos. He received the nominations for FAMAS Award Best Actor in Sabotage (1966) and I Love Mama, I Love Papa (1971).

Career
Laxa was born in Macabebe, Pampanga, Philippines.

His first film was Kilabot sa Barilan (1960) with Fernando Poe Jr. and Zaldy Zshornack. His next supporting roles were in such war films as Mga Tigreng Tagabukid (1962) and Suicide Commandos (1962) starring Fernando Poe Jr., Romeo Vasquez and Joseph Estrada.

He starred in Marcong Bagsik (1964) with Divina Valencia. He starred as Tony Falcon, Agent X-44 in Sabotage (1966), directed by Eddie Garcia. He did drama films like Living Doll (1970) and The Golden Child (1971) with Snooky Serna. He did action films like Walang Duwag Sa Kayumanggi (1975) with Lotis Key, Mission: Get The Killers On The Loose (1975) with Gina Pareño, Alat (1975) with Chanda Romero, and Jailbreak! (1976) with Alma Moreno.

He was also paired with Niño Muhlach in Wonder Boy (1976). Ferrer was paired with Nora Aunor in Sa Lungga ng Mga Daga (1978).

He starred with Ramon Revilla in Nardong Putik (1972), Lito Lapid in Back To Back (1979), Ramon Zamora in Experts (1979), Rey Malonzo in Deadly Fighters (1979), Ace Vergel in Pangkat Do Or Die (1980), Vic Vargas in Dope Godfathers (1983), Bembol Roco and Efren Reyes Jr. in Over My Dead Body (1983), Fernando Poe Jr in Ang Agila at ang Falcon (1980), Bong Revilla in Chinatown: Sa Kuko ng Dragon (1988), Ronnie Ricketts in Black Sheep Baby (1989) and Jess Lapid Jr. in Isang Milyon sa Ulo ni Cobra (1990).

He also did international films like The Vengeance of Fu Manchu (1967) with Christopher Lee, Cosa Nostra Asia (1974) with Chris Mitchum, Blind Rage (1978) with Fred Williamson, and Cover Girl Models (1975) with Pat Anderson for New World Pictures.

On the July 2, 1981, Ferrer's directorial debut the musical film Legs... Katawan... Babae! premiered, it's a film vehicle for the disco group Hagibis. The film co-stars Myrna Castillo, Laarni Enriquez, Dinah Dominguez  Val Iglesias, etc.

Ferrer had special participation as Tony Falcon in the remake of Agent X44 (2007), an action-comedy, played by Vhong Navarro.

He appeared in more than 155 films, including the 21-film series Agent X-44.

Personal life
Ferrer was the younger brother of Espiridion Laxa, producer of Tagalog Ilang-Ilang Pictures and EDL Productions.

He was paired with Mutya ng Pilipinas Alice Crisostomo in The Golden Child (1971), and subsequently married her a year later. They have two kids, actress Mutya Crisostomo and Falcon. He has a daughter with actress Imelda Ilanan, Maricel Laxa. He also has a son, Mark by Pinky Poblete. Ferrer lived with a non-showbiz partner.

His grandson, Donny Pangilinan, is also an actor.

Death
Ferrer died on 23 January 2021 at home in Pasig, at the age of 86 due to heart illness and diabetic complications.

Selected filmography
Agent X44 (2007)
Akala Mo (2002)
Mahal Kita... Kahit Sino Ka Pa! (2001)
Total Aikido (2001)
Pards 2 (1997)
Tawagin Mo Ang Lahat ng Santo (1997)
Adan Lazaro (1996)
Matinik Na Kalaban (1995)
Manila Boy (1993)
Aguinaldo (1993)
Geron Olivar (1993)
Pambato (1993)
Patapon (1993) 
Bukas Tatakpan Ka ng Diyaryo (1993)
Sonny Boy, Public Enemy No. 1 of Cebu (1992)
Digos Massacre (1991)
Hepe, Isasabay Kita sa Paglubog ng Araw (1991)
Ipaglaban Mo Ako, Boy Topak (1991)
Isang Milyon sa Ulo ni Cobra (1990)
May Araw Ka Rin Bagallon (1990)
Kahit Singko Ay Di Ko Babayaran ang Buhay Mo (1990)
Black Sheep Baby (1989)
Isang Bala, Isang Buhay (1989)
Chinatown: Sa Kuko ng Dragon (1988) - Peter Wang
Kamandag sa Araw (1987)
Walang Ititirang Buhay (1986)
Boy Tipos (1985)
Hanggang sa Huling Bala (1984)
Over My Dead Body (1983)
Shoot the Killer (1981)
Ang Agila at ang Falcon (1980)
The Experts (1979)
Sabotage 2 (1979) - Agent X-44
Blind Rage (1978)
Sa Lungga ng Mga Daga (1978) 
Last Target (1978)
Cortes (1977)
Jailbreak! (1976)
Ben Boga (1976)
The Interceptors (1976)
Mission: Get The Killers On the Loose (1975)
Walang Duwag sa Kayumanggi (1975)
Cover Girl Models (1975)
Death Machine (1975)
Magnum 44 (1974) - Agent X-44
Kung Fu Master (1974)
Dakilang 9 (1973)
Nardong Putik (1972)
I Love Mama, I Love Papa (1971)
Biyak Na Bato (1970)
Infiltrators (1969)
Masters of Karate (1968)
The Vengeance of Fu Manchu (1967)
Frame Up! (1967) - Agent X-44
Sabotage (1966) - Agent X-44Interpol: Hadlang sa Manlulupig (1965) - Agent X-44Tatlo sa Tatlo (1965)Kalaban ng Sindikato (1965) - Agent X-44G-2 (1965) - Agent X-44Dugong Tigre (1964)Limang Kidlat (1963)Mga Tigreng Taga-Bukid (1962)Baril sa Baril (1961)Kilabot sa Barilan'' (1960)

References

External links

1934 births
2021 deaths
Filipino male karateka
Tony
Male actors from Pampanga
Deaths from diabetes